Ingrid Finger is a German beauty queen who became the first representative from her country to win the Miss International pageant in 1965.

Nicknamed Fifi, Finger bested a field of 44 delegates to win the title in Long Beach, California. Since the successive edition of the pageant was held two years after her crowning in 1967, she holds the distinction for the longest reign of any Miss International winner until Sireethorn Leearamwat surpassed her. By the time she passed on her crown to Mirta Massa of Argentina, her reign had exceeded 20 months.

References

Miss International winners
Miss International 1965 delegates
Year of birth missing (living people)
Living people
German beauty pageant winners